Friedrich Ludwig Emil Diels (24 September 1874 – 30 November 1945) was a German botanist.

Diels was born in Hamburg, the son of the classical scholar Hermann Alexander Diels. From 1900 to 1902 he traveled together with Ernst Georg Pritzel through South Africa, Java, Australia and New Zealand.

Shortly before the First World War he travelled New Guinea and in the 1930s in Ecuador. Especially his collections of plants from Australia and Ecuador, which contained numerous holotypes, enriched the knowledge of the concerning floras. His monography on the Droseraceae from 1906 is still a standard.

The majority of his collections were stored at the botanical garden in Berlin-Dahlem, whose vicedirector he had been since 1913, becoming its director in 1921 until 1945. His collections were destroyed there during an air raid in 1943.  He died in Berlin on 30 November 1945.

Honours
Several genus of plants have been named after him including; Dielsantha (from Campanulaceae family), Dielsia (from Restionaceae), Dielsiocharis (from Brassicaceae) and Dielsiothamnus (from Annonaceae family).
Also Dielitzia (from Asteraceae family), is named after Ludwig Diels and Ernst Georg Pritzel (1875–1946).

References

20th-century German botanists
Scientists from Hamburg
1874 births
1945 deaths